Governor Irwin may refer to:

Jared Irwin (1750–1818), 22nd and 26th Governor of Georgia
John Irwin (British Army officer) (1727–1788), Governor of Gibraltar from 1765 to 1767 and Governor of Londonderry 1775 to 1776
John N. Irwin (died 1905), 9th Governor of Idaho Territory
William Irwin (California politician) (1827–1886), 13th Governor of California

See also
Governor Irwin (fireboat), served in San Francisco from 1878 to 1909